Novumbra is a genus of mudminnows (family Umbridae) native to Oregon and Washington state, USA. Molecular data suggests that this genus is more closely related to Esox than Dallia and Umbra. Novumbra diverged from Esox roughly 65 million years ago in the Paleocene.

Species 
Two species in this genus are recognized:

Novumbra hubbsi  L. P. Schultz, 1929  (Olympic mudminnow)
†Novumbra oregonensis Cavender, 1969

References

Umbridae
Ray-finned fish genera
Taxa named by Leonard Peter Schultz